Kappa Beta Pi is a Legal Association which was formerly a professional law sorority in the United States.

History
Its Founders were:

The sorority was incorporated in Illinois on December 15, 1908. This date is celebrated by chapters as Founders' Day.  The organization was the first legal sorority in the U.S., that is, the first such group designed in the support of the legal profession.

Since 1925, admission of new chapters has been limited to American schools that met the requirements for membership in the Association of American Law Schools, or to schools on the approved list of the American Bar Association, along with those foreign law schools meeting equivalent requirements.

In 1927 its first international chapter was formed, Omicron chapter, in Paris, France. This was later followed by chapters in London, England, in West Germany, in Shanghai, China, several in Canada, and one in the US Territory of Puerto Rico.

During the first half of the 20th Century, the Sorority published lists of law firms that would hire women, and those which resisted.  It also published catalogs of female judges and lawyers serving in the field.

At the 1973 convention, the name was changed to Kappa Beta Pi Legal Association International, and from this juncture is now properly referred to as a legal association, not a sorority.

At the May 1976 convention in Columbus Ohio, all references believed to indicate a restriction of membership to women were removed.

Kappa Beta Pi had been a chartering member of the Professional Panhellenic Association, and thus became a member of the Professional Fraternity Association (PFA) when the PPA merged with the Professional Interfraternity Association.  Later, Kappa Beta Pi resigned from the PFA.

Some records of the organization's headquarters were provided to the Denver Public Library, which reports 17 boxes of materials spanning from 1930 to 1979.

The last known address for this Legal Association was either in Silver Spring, MD (per Baird's) or in Omaha, NE (Guidestar).  As of November 2021, Guidestar reports "no activity for some time". The organization may be defunct.

Traditions and Insignia
The pledge pin is an irregularly shaped shield enameled in Turquoise and old gold.

The coat of arms places a field of Turquoise blue in the upper left, while the lower right field is white. Devices, the Open Book, and Scales are rendered in gold. The Knight's Helmet is shown proper, that is, in the natural color, shown full face with the visor open and is of steel with silver ornaments. The helmet symbolizes the protection of the law, and inspires chivalrous conduct.

The flower is the Yellow Tea Rose.

The colors are turquoise blue and old gold.

The official song, To Kappa Beta Pi was written in 1941 by Alice Craig Edgerton.

The organization publishes a quarterly, called The Kappa Beta Pi Quarterly, one edition annually in an esoteric form, called The Secret Bulletin.

A fifty-year history was also written by Ms. Edgerton, who served as its first Grand Dean, or president, and published by the organization.

Chapters
The chapter roll of Kappa Beta Pi Legal Association. Chapters in italics are dormant. Chapters in bold are active. Those unknown are in plain text.
1908 - Alpha - Chicago-Kent Law
1915 - Beta - Northwestern University
1916 - Gamma - DePaul University
1916 - Delta - Chicago
1916 - Epsilon - American University
1916 - Zeta - John Marshall Law, Chicago
1916 - Eta - University of Texas Law
1917 - Theta - Kansas City
1917 - Iota - California (dormant between 1945–46)
1920 - Kappa - Yale University (dormant 1929)
1920 - Lambda - Detroit
1920 - Mu - Detroit Law (dormant between 1939–59)
1920 - Nu - George Washington University
1921 - Xi - Michigan
1921 - Omicron - National Law (school merged with George Washington)
1921 - Pi - Washington (MO)
1921 - Rho - Iowa
1921 - Sigma - Cornell (dormant 1939)
1921 - Tau - Boston
1921 - Upsilon - Syracuse
1921 - Phi - Illinois
1921 - Chi - Oregon
1921 - Psi - Wisconsin, Madison
1923 - Omega - University of Southern California (dormant 1949)
1923 - Alpha Alpha - John Marshall Law, Cleveland
1923 - Alpha Beta - Minnesota (dormant in 1958)
1924 - Alpha Gamma - Southwestern, Los Angeles
1924 - Alpha Delta - Buffalo
1924 - Alpha Epsilon - Chicago-Kent Law (school closed in 1935) 
1924 - Alpha Zeta - Marquette University
1924 - Alpha Eta - Hastings Law (dormant in 1957)
1924 - Alpha Theta - Loyola, Chicago
1925 - Alpha Iota - St. Louis
1925 - Alpha Kappa - Creighton
1925 - Alpha Lambda - Nebraska (dormant 1942-1951
1925 - Alpha Mu - Osgoode, Toronto, Canada
1926 - Alpha Nu - Ohio State University
1926 - Alpha Xi- University of Oklahoma
1927 - Alpha Omicron - Paris, France
1930 - Alpha Pi - Tulane
1931 - Alpha Rho - Alabama
1931 - Alpha Sigma - Denver
1931 - Alpha Tau - North Dakota
1932 - Alpha Upsilon - West Virginia University
1932 - Alpha Phi - University of Arizona
1934 - Alpha Chi - Columbia (dormant 1938-57)
1940 - Alpha Psi - Southern Methodist
1940 - Alpha Omega - Drake
1940 - Beta Alpha - London, England
1946 - Beta Beta - Missouri (dormant 1950-51)
1946 - Beta Gamma - Columbus Law (DC)
1946 - Beta Delta - San Francisco
19xx - Beta Epsilon - ? 
1947 - Beta Zeta - Shanghai (China)
1948 - Beta Eta - South Dakota
1949 - Beta Theta - Miami (FL)
1949 - Beta Iota - Emory (dormant 1952-53)
1950 - Beta Kappa - Virginia
1952 - Beta Lambda - St. Mary's San Antonio
1953 - Beta Mu - Georgetown
1954 - Beta Nu, West Germany
1955 - Beta Xi - Houston
1956 - Beta Omicron - Toledo
1958 - Beta Pi - Boston Law
1960 - Beta Rho - Kentucky
1962 - Beta Sigma - Seton Hall
1962 - Beta Tau - Rutgers (dormant 1970)
1963 - Beta Upsilon - Howard University (dormant 1974)
1963 - Beta Phi - Fordham (dormant 1970)
1963 - Beta Chi - Kentucky (dormant 1971) 
1964 - Beta Psi - Puerto Rico (dormant 1973)
1966 - Beta Omega - Ohio Northern
1966 - Gamma Alpha - Colorado (dormant 1972)
1967 - Gamma Beta - Franklin (OH) (dormant 1973)
1967 - Gamma Gamma - University of Arkansas
1967 - Gamma Delta - Arkansas, Little Rock
1968 - Gamma Epsilon - New Brunswick, Canada (dormant 1973)
1970 - Gamma Zeta - Mississippi
1971 - Gamma Eta - Texas Tech
1972 - Gamma Theta - Pitt (dormant 1973)
1972 - Gamma Iota - Duquesne (dormant 1973)
1973 - Gamma Kappa - Windsor, Ontario, Canada
1974 - Gamma Lambda - Ottawa, Ontario, Canada

See also 
 Order of the Coif (honor society, law)
 The Order of Barristers (honor society, law; litigation)
 Phi Delta Phi (honor society, law; was a professional fraternity)
 Alpha Phi Sigma (honor society, criminal justice)
 Lambda Epsilon Chi (honor society, paralegal)

 Delta Theta Phi (professional fraternity, law)
 Gamma Eta Gamma (professional fraternity, law)
 Phi Alpha Delta (professional fraternity, law)
 Phi Beta Gamma (professional fraternity, law)
 Phi Delta Delta (professional fraternity, women, law)
 Sigma Delta Kappa (professional fraternity, law)
 Kappa Alpha Pi (professional) (professional fraternity, pre-law)

 Nu Beta Epsilon (Jewish, originally men's professional fraternity, law, dormant?)

References

Professional legal fraternities and sororities in the United States
Student organizations established in 1908
Legal organizations based in the United States
Former members of Professional Fraternity Association
1908 establishments in Illinois